Píxeles de familia is a 2019 Peruvian drama film written and directed by Gerardo Ruiz Miñán in his directorial debut. It tells the story of a family from Lima, whose routine is altered by circumstances that can happen to anyone. It stars Paul Vega, Sergio Gjurinovic, Yvonne Frayssinet, Wendy Vásquez and Lizet Chávez. It premiered on 10 October 2019 in Peruvian theaters.

Synopsis 
Polo and Monica's marriage is going through a crisis. At the same time, Bicho, Monica's brother, is keeping a secret and must deal with his mother's crisis. A sudden accident might be able to get this family back together. A pixel is just a dot in the middle of nowhere, it needs to be by the side of others to understand its true self.

Cast 
The actors participating in this film are:

 Paul Vega as Polo
 Wendy Vásquez as Mónica
 Yvonne Frayssinet as Carmela
 Sergio Gjurinovic as 'Bicho'
 Lizet Chávez as Lucía

Release 
Filming took place in 2012, but it was only possible to release it in 2019 when the film won the award for production and distribution from the Directorate of Audiovisuals, Phonography and New Media (DAFO), of the Ministry of Culture in 2018. It premiered on 10 October 2019 in Peruvian theaters.

References

External links 

 

2019 films
2019 drama films
Peruvian drama films
2010s Spanish-language films
2010s Peruvian films
Films set in Peru
Films shot in Peru
Films about families
Films about marriage
2019 directorial debut films